This is a list of Danish television related events from 2017.

Television shows

1990s
Hvem vil være millionær? (1999–present)

2000s
Vild med dans (2005–present)
X Factor (2008–present)

2010s
Voice – Danmarks største stemme (2011–present)
The Bridge (2011–present)
Danmark har talent (2014–present)

See also
 2017 in Denmark